Rudolfe I (Rudolf, Raoul) (died before 946 or 948) was the Count of Ivois.

Family 
Léon Vanderkindere has speculated (1900, p. 342) that, based on his connection to Velm, mentioned in an act made by his son Conrad before he died, it is "not without some likelihood" that he is a member of the Regnarid family, where the name Rodolphe was familiar. 

Rudolfe married Eva (d. after 946) and they had three children:
 Rudolfe II (d. 963), Count of Ivois and Verdun
 Conrad (killed at the Battle of Cotrone on 15 July 982)
 Hildegonde, married first Walfrid (d. 955) and second Odacre (d. after 991), Count of Saarbrücken.

Rudolfe was succeeded as Count of Ivois by his son Rudolfe II.

Notes

Sources
Vanderkindere, Léon, La Formation territoriale des principautés belges au Moyen Âge, Bruxelles, H. Lamertin, 1902

External links
Medieval Lands Project, Comtes d’Ivois et Chiny

Counts of Ivois
940s deaths
Year of death uncertain
Year of birth unknown